Andre Darrell Scrubb (born January 13, 1995) is an American professional baseball pitcher who is a free agent. He played college baseball at High Point University. Scrubb was selected by the Los Angeles Dodgers in the eighth round of the 2016 MLB draft. He made his MLB debut in 2020.

Amateur career
Scrubb attended C. D. Hylton High School in Woodbridge, Virginia. In 2013, his senior year, he pitched to a 6–2 record and a 1.57 ERA while batting .395.

Undrafted out of high school in the 2013 Major League Baseball draft, he enrolled at High Point University where he played college baseball. In 2014, Scrubb's freshman season at High Point, he appeared in 14 games (12 starts), going 2–5 with a 5.22 ERA. As a sophomore in 2015, he pitched in 19 games (making three starts) and went 6–1 with a 2.50 ERA, striking out 48 over 54 innings. After the season, he played in the Cape Cod Baseball League for the Chatham Anglers. In 2016, his junior year, he pitched to an 8–6 record and a 4.86 ERA over 14 starts. He struggled with command, walking 54 batters and throwing 15 wild pitches, but also striking out 94, in 74 innings. After the season, Scrubb was selected by the Los Angeles Dodgers in the eighth round of the 2016 MLB draft.

Professional career

Los Angeles Dodgers organization
Scrubb signed with the Dodgers and made his professional debut with the Arizona League Dodgers, pitching  innings in which he compiled an ERA of 2.13. In 2017, Scrubb played for the Great Lakes Loons, posting a 6–2 record and a 1.74 ERA over  relief innings.

In 2018, Scrubb returned to Great Lakes to begin the year and was named a Midwest League All-Star. He was promoted to the Rancho Cucamonga Quakes in June and to the Tulsa Drillers in August. Over 38 relief appearances between the three clubs, Scrubb went 7–2 with a 2.86 ERA, striking out 72 batters over 63 innings. In 2019, he began the season with Tulsa, earning Texas League All-Star honors.

Houston Astros
On July 25, 2019, Scrubb was traded to the Houston Astros in exchange for Tyler White. Houston assigned him to the Corpus Christi Hooks, with whom he finished the year. Over 41 appearances (two starts) between the two clubs, Scrubb went 6–1 with a 2.78 ERA, striking out 76 over  innings.

On July 28, 2020, Scrubb was added to Houston's MLB roster following an arm injury to Joe Biagini. He made his MLB debut that night against the Los Angeles Dodgers. Over  relief innings pitched with the Astros in 2020, Scrubb went 1-0 with a 1.90 ERA, 24 strikeouts and 20 walks in 20 games. He was added to their postseason roster.

Scrubb began 2021 with Houston, but also spent time with the Sugar Land Skeeters with whom he pitched 15 innings. Scrubb pitched a total of  innings with the Astros, going 1-1 with a 5.03 ERA and 21 strikeouts. On August 10, 2021, he was placed on the 60-day injured list with a right shoulder strain. On November 30, Scrubb was designated for assignment and outrighted to the Skeeters. He elected free agency on November 10, 2022.

References

External links

1995 births
Living people
Arizona League Dodgers players
Baseball players from Virginia
Corpus Christi Hooks players
Chatham Anglers players
Glendale Desert Dogs players
Great Lakes Loons players
High Point Panthers baseball players
Houston Astros players
Major League Baseball pitchers
People from Woodbridge, Virginia
Rancho Cucamonga Quakes players
Sugar Land Skeeters players
Tulsa Drillers players
Toros del Este players
Fayetteville Woodpeckers players
Cangrejeros de Santurce (baseball) players
American expatriate baseball players in the Dominican Republic
African-American baseball players
2023 World Baseball Classic players